The Bashi Formation is a geologic formation in Alabama and Mississippi. It is named for Bashi Creek in northern Clarke County, Alabama, which cuts through some of its exposures.  It preserves fossils dating back to the Eocene period, or Wasatchian in the NALMA classification.

Fossil content 
The following fossils have been reported from the formation:
Reptiles
 Palaeophis cf. littoralis
 Palaeophis virginianus

Fish

 Coupatezia woutersi
 Dasyatis tricuspidatus
 Myliobatis dixoni
 Archaeomanta melenhorsti
 Burnhamia daviesi
 Burnhamia fetahi
 Meridiania convexa
 Platyrhina dockeryi
 Rhinobatos sp.
 Eotorpedo jaeckeli
 Striatolamia macrota
 Anomotodon sp.
 Cretolamna aschersoni
 Cretolamna lerichei
 Odontaspis borodini
 Odontaspis speyeri
 Odontaspis winkleri
 Pseudodontaspis lauderdalensis
 Brachycarcharias mississippiensis
 Physogaleus americanus
 Physogaleus tertius
 Abdounia subulidens
 Abdounia beaugei
 Galeus sp.
 Microscyliorhinus leggetti
 Scyliorhinus gilberti
 Galeorhinus affini
 Galeorhinus minor
 Heterodontus sowasheense
 Ginglymostoma subafricanum
 Nebrius thielensis
 Conger meridies

See also 
 List of fossiliferous stratigraphic units in Alabama
 Paleontology in Alabama

References

Bibliography 

 
 
 

Geologic formations of Alabama
Geologic formations of Mississippi
Paleogene Alabama
Paleogene Mississippi
Ypresian Stage
Wasatchian
Marl formations
Shallow marine deposits
Paleontology in Alabama
Paleontology in Mississippi